Titane ("Titanium") is a 2021 body horror psychological drama film written and directed by Julia Ducournau. The French-Belgian co-production stars Agathe Rousselle in her feature film debut as Alexia, a woman who, after being injured in a car accident as a child, has a titanium plate fitted into her head. Vincent Lindon, Garance Marillier and Laïs Salameh also star.

The film had its world premiere at the Cannes Film Festival on 13 July 2021, where Ducournau became the second female director to win the Palme d'Or, the festival's top award, as well as the first female filmmaker to win solo. It received critical acclaim and was selected as the French entry for the Best International Feature Film at the 94th Academy Awards, but did not make the shortlist. At the 47th César Awards, it was nominated for four awards, including Best Director for Ducournau and Most Promising Actress for Rousselle. At the 75th British Academy Film Awards, Ducournau received a nomination for Best Director. At the 11th Magritte Awards, Titane received five nominations and won two awards, including Best Foreign Film.

Plot
A little girl named Alexia annoys her father during a drive. As she removes her seatbelt, her father turns around to scold her, causing a car crash. Alexia suffers a skull injury and has a titanium plate fitted into her head. When she gets out of the hospital, she shuns her parents and embraces their car passionately.

Years later, Alexia, now an adult with a large scar on the side of her head, works as a showgirl at a motor show. One night, after a show, a male fan follows Alexia in the showroom's parking lot, declares his love to her, and forcibly kisses her; she then brutally kills him using her large metal hairpin. As she returns to the showroom to shower, Alexia finds that the car she modeled with earlier has turned on by itself. She enters it naked, has sex with the car, and climaxes.

It is revealed that Alexia is a serial killer who has murdered several men and women in the past few months. She still lives with her parents, who seem unaware of her connection with the crimes and with whom she has a distant relationship.

Alexia attends a house party, where she starts to have sex with her coworker Justine. However, motor oil begins secreting from her vagina. She takes a pregnancy test, which returns a positive result, and tries to perform an abortion on the spot, using her hairpin, but fails. She comes out of the bathroom and murders Justine and the other guests, but one woman manages to escape. Alexia returns home and tries to burn a bloodied blanket, which sets the house on fire. She locks her parents in their bedroom and leaves.

Now wanted for murder, Alexia alters her appearance to pretend to be Adrien Legrand, a young boy who had disappeared ten years before, at age seven, by cutting her hair, taping down her breasts and pregnant belly, and breaking her own nose. She then goes to the police claiming that she's Adrien, where his father, Vincent, a fire captain, accepts Alexia as his missing son and refuses to do a DNA test.

Vincent takes Alexia to the station where he lives and works, and introduces her to his men. The firefighters are puzzled by the mute, androgynous, and apparently traumatized "Adrien", but they refrain from questioning the captain's behavior. Alexia becomes an apprentice at the station, under Vincent's supervision. As Vincent gives more responsibility to his "son" over the other experienced firefighters, one firefighter confronts Vincent about "Adrien's" identity. However, Vincent immediately shuts him down and tells him to never speak of his son.

Vincent tries to preserve his strength by injecting steroids into his aging body, but he finds that he seems to be building an immunity to them. Alexia is increasingly disturbed by his possessiveness and considers escaping from the fire station. However, after Vincent experiences arrhythmia from injecting a large dose of steroids, Alexia decides to stay with him.

Vincent's long-estranged ex-wife comes to see her "son", and ends up discovering a now-heavily pregnant Alexia without her body taped down. She nevertheless keeps the secret for herself, not wishing to interfere with her ex-husband's delusion, and begs Alexia to take care of him. Vincent eventually acknowledges his delusion, telling Alexia that "whoever you are, you are my son." When he inadvertently uncovers her breasts, he is shocked but continues caring for her.

At a party at the fire station, the firefighters urge "Adrien" to dance to the music. Alexia breaks out her showgirl choreography, confusing everyone. Vincent, disappointed, walks out of the crowd. After the party, Alexia has sex with a fire truck.

Alexia's body gradually breaks down, as the skin of her stomach tears to reveal new metal plates. When her pregnancy comes to term, Alexia reveals her real name to Vincent, briefly attempting to seduce him and then begging for his help. Vincent helps Alexia give birth, the titanium side of her skull splitting open on her final push, killing her. The newborn's body appears with patches of titanium on its body. Vincent says repeatedly to the baby, "I'm here."

Cast

Production
In September 2019, it was announced that Vincent Lindon and Agathe Rousselle had joined the cast of the film, with Julia Ducournau directing the film from a screenplay she wrote. Neon distributed the film in the United States.

Production was initially set to begin in April 2020, but was delayed due to the COVID-19 pandemic. Principal photography eventually began in September 2020.

Release
Titane had its world premiere at the Cannes Film Festival on 13 July 2021, where it received the Palme d'Or, the festival's top award. The film also screened at New York, London and Toronto.

Altitude Film Distribution and Film4 jointly acquired distribution rights for the film in the UK and Ireland in June 2021, prior to the film's Cannes premiere. It was released in France by Diaphana Distribution on 14 July 2021, in Belgium by O'Brother Distribution on 28 July 2021, and in the United States by Neon on 1 October 2021.

Reception

Critical response
On review aggregator website Rotten Tomatoes, the film holds an approval rating of 90% based on 248 reviews, with an average rating of 7.8/10. The site's critics consensus reads, "Thrillingly provocative and original, Titane reaffirms writer-director Julia Ducournau's delightfully disturbing vision." On Metacritic, the film holds a rating of 75 out of 100, based on 46 critics, indicating "generally favorable reviews."

Nicholas Barber from BBC gave the film four out of five stars and called it "the most shocking film of 2021." In his review for Variety, Peter Debruge called the film, "a cross between David Cronenberg’s Crash and the uterine horrors of Takashi Miike’s Gozu," and praised Ducournau for her handling of the film's themes. In The Observer, Mark Kermode also compared the film to Crash whilst praising its cinematography and emotional depth, and listed it as one of the best films of 2021. Clarisse Loughrey in The Independent praised Rousselle and Lindon's performances and Ducournau's direction. In NME, Lou Thomas gave the film five out of five stars and called it a "masterpiece". In a more negative review, Peter Bradshaw, writing for The Guardian, gave the film 2 out of 5 stars and compared it unfavorably to Ducournau's previous film, stating; "...everything is so labored and crudely directed, without the style and sympathy of  Raw." Jude Dry in IndieWire was also critical of the film, calling it a "deeply misogynist movie with a healthy side of transphobia".

Accolades 
Titane had its world premiere at the Cannes Film Festival on 13 July 2021. During the beginning of the closing ceremony, jury president Spike Lee was told in French to reveal the "first prize", but misinterpreted the phrase to mean "first place". As a result, he prematurely revealed that the film had won the Palme d'Or. Ducournau is the second female director to win the award after Jane Campion in 1993 for The Piano, the first to win not jointly with another director (Campion had won jointly alongside Chen Kaige, who won for Farewell My Concubine), and the fourth woman overall to win after Adèle Exarchopoulos and Léa Seydoux won in 2013 for their performances in Blue is the Warmest Colour.

At the 2021 Toronto International Film Festival, the film won the People's Choice Award for Midnight Madness. On 12 October 2021, it was selected as the French entry for the Best International Feature Film at the 94th Academy Awards, but did not make the shortlist. At the 47th César Awards, it was nominated for four awards, including Best Director for Ducournau and Most Promising Actress for Rousselle. At the 75th British Academy Film Awards, Ducournau received a nomination for Best Director. At the 11th Magritte Awards, Titane'' received five nominations and won two awards, including Best Foreign Film.

See also
 List of submissions to the 94th Academy Awards for Best International Feature Film
 List of French submissions for the Academy Award for Best International Feature Film

References

External links
 
 
 

2021 films
French horror films
Belgian horror films
Neon (distributor) films
Wild Bunch films
Arte France Cinéma films
Films directed by Julia Ducournau
French LGBT-related films
Lesbian-related films
Female bisexuality in film
Bisexuality-related films
Transgender-related films
Cross-dressing in film
2021 LGBT-related films
LGBT-related horror films
Magritte Award winners
Palme d'Or winners
French serial killer films
Films about road accidents and incidents
Films about firefighting
Body horror films
Belgian LGBT-related films
Films set in Provence-Alpes-Côte d'Azur
Films impacted by the COVID-19 pandemic
2021 horror films
Films about automobiles
Films about identity theft
2020s French-language films
French-language Belgian films
2020s avant-garde and experimental films
2020s French films